Ujimqin (also Ujumqin, Ujumucin, Ujumchin, Uzemchin or Üzemchin) may refer to:

 East Ujimqin Banner, subdivision of Inner Mongolia, China
 West Ujimqin Banner, subdivision of Inner Mongolia, China
 Üzemchin Mongols or their language